Ryan Piers Williams (born May 13, 1981) is an American actor, director, and writer.

Early life
Williams was raised in El Paso, Texas, where he attended J. M. Hanks High School. From age 13 he wanted to be a director and took theater and video production classes in both middle school and high school. He went to study film at the University of Texas at Austin for 2 1/2 years before transferring as a junior to the University of Southern California and eventually being accepted into its School of Cinematic Arts.

Career
Williams wrote and directed the films The Dry Land (2010) and X/Y (2014). He was a producer of writer-director Walter Strafford's Kilimanjaro (2013). Williams additionally has performed as an actor, in the 2007 short Muertas, which he directed, wrote and produced; and the features Blues (2008), Tomorrow Comes Today (2013), his own X/Y (2014), and 1985 (2018).

Personal life
Williams married America Ferrera on June 27, 2011.  He directed her in the 2010 film The Dry Land, which received Imagen Awards nominations for best feature film and for Ferrera's performance as best actress. The couple had son  Sebastian in May 2018, and daughter Lucia on May 4, 2020.

Filmography
The Dry Land (2010)
Kilimanjaro (2013)
X/Y (2014)

References

External links

American male film actors
American film directors
American male screenwriters
Living people
21st-century American screenwriters
1981 births
21st-century American male writers